Tirat Yehuda (lit. Judah's Castle) is a moshav in central Israel. Located near Yehud and Ben Gurion International Airport, it falls under the jurisdiction of Hevel Modi'in Regional Council.

History
During the 18th and 19th centuries, Tirat Yehuda was the site of the village of al-Tira (Tirat Dandan). It belonged to the Nahiyeh (sub-district) of Lod that encompassed the area of the present-day city of Modi'in-Maccabim-Re'ut in the south to the present-day city of El'ad in the north, and from the foothills in the east, through the Lod Valley to the outskirts of Jaffa in the west. This area was home to thousands of inhabitants in about 20 villages, who had at their disposal tens of thousands of hectares of prime agricultural land.

The moshav was established in 1949 by Jewish immigrants from Hungary. Initially, it was located northeast of its present site, in the area which is today Bareket, before moving to its current location in 1951. It was named after the nearby depopulated   Palestinian village of al-Tira on which land it was located, and the fact that it was in the vicinity of the border of the land of the Tribe of Judah.

In its first years, it was attacked several times by the Palestinian fedayeen, and was a designated border settlement until the 1967 Six-Day War.

References

Moshavim
Religious Israeli communities
Populated places established in 1949
Populated places in Central District (Israel)
1949 establishments in Israel
Hungarian-Jewish culture in Israel